The mixed doubles badminton event at the 2011 Pan American Games was held from October 15–20 at the Multipurpose Gymnasium in Guadalajara. The defending Pan American Games champions were Eva Lee and Howard Bach of the United States, while the defending Pan American Championship champions were Toby Ng and Grace Gao of Canada. The mixed doubles was the final badminton event of the Games.

The athletes were drawn into an elimination stage draw. Once a team lost a match it was no longer able to compete. The draw for the competition was done on October 7, 2011.

Seeds

  (champions)'  (final)  (semifinals)  (second round)''

Results

Finals

Top Half

Bottom Half

References

External links
Draw with results

Mixed Doubles
Panamerican